Pat Proctor is a Kansas State Representative, representing the 41st House District (Fort Leavenworth and Leavenworth, Kansas). He was first elected in November 2020.

Pat Proctor is also a retired United States Army colonel from Leavenworth, Kansas. Proctor is a graduate of the School of Advanced Military Studies. Proctor most recently deployed to Jordan as a battalion commander.  In 2009, he deployed as the operations officer for Task Force Patriot (2nd Battalion, 32nd Field Artillery) to Saddam Hussein's hometown of Tikrit, Iraq. In 2007, Proctor worked as part of the Joint Strategic Assessment Team, a team of diplomats, military theorists, and intellectuals assembled by Gen. David Petraeus and Ambassador Ryan Crocker to develop the strategy for post-surge Iraq.

Proctor is an assistant professor of homeland security at Wichita State University.

Writings
Since 2008, Proctor has been an active freelance writer.  He has been published in the US Army War College journal, Parameters, and online at StrategyPage.com and Armchair General.  He just completed work on his fourth book, Lessons Unlearned: The U.S. Army's Role in Creating the Forever-Wars in Afghanistan and Iraq. This book will be published by the University of Missouri Press in February 2020.

Proctor, Pat (with Carolyn Wheater and Jane R. Burstein), ASVAB AFQT Cram Plan, (New York: Cliffs Notes, 2010), .
Proctor, Pat, Media War: The Media-Enabled Insurgency in Iraq, (Manhattan, KS: ProSIM, 2010), .

Proctor, Pat, Task Force Patriot and the End of Combat Operations in Iraq, (Lanham, MD: Government Institutes, 2012), .
Proctor, Pat, Containment and Credibility: The Ideology and Deception that Plunged America into the Vietnam War, (New York: Carrel Books, 2016), .

Proctor, Pat, Lessons Unlearned: The U.S. Army's Role in Creating the Forever Wars in Afghanistan and Iraq, (Columbia, MO: University of Missouri, 2020), .

Proctor also maintains a blog, Media Warfare, which covers various topics and includes discussion of wargames, book reviews, and commentary on current events.

Wargame developer
Proctor is also a wargame developer and founder of ProSIM Company.  This company develops computer wargames that are published by Shrapnel Games (an internet wargame distributor).  ProSIM is known for its simulations of modern warfare, including such titles as BCT Commander, Armored Task Force, and Air Assault Task Force.  ProSIM has also worked with military contractors such as Boeing and Lockheed Martin to produce ground combat simulations.

Notes

External links
Shrapnel Games, Inc
ProSIM Company, Inc
http://www.prosimco.com/writing

1971 births
Living people
United States Army colonels
United States Army personnel of the Iraq War
Counterinsurgency theorists
Video game designers
Purdue University alumni
Republican Party members of the Kansas House of Representatives
21st-century American politicians